Tyrannodoris europaea, is a species  of sea slug, a polycerid nudibranch, a marine gastropod mollusc in the family Polyceridae.

The size of this nudibranch's mitochondrial DNA is 14,472 bp, which is one of the smallest among the Metazoa.

Distribution
This species was described from the Strait of Gibraltar, Spain. It is found in the Mediterranean Sea and adjacent Atlantic Ocean including the Azores and Canary Islands.

References

Polyceridae
Gastropods described in 1985